Tarball may refer to:
 Tarball (computing), a type of archive file
 Tarball (oil), a blob of semi-solid oil found on or near the ocean